The Minaret is a steep rock pinnacle,  high, on the ridge extending northeast from Mount William in the southern part of Anvers Island, in the Palmer Archipelago, Antarctica. It was surveyed by the Falkland Islands Dependencies Survey in 1944 and again in 1955. The name, given by the UK Antarctic Place-Names Committee, is descriptive of the shape of the summit, suggesting a minaret.

References

Rock formations of the Palmer Archipelago
Geography of the British Antarctic Territory